Foxxy may mean:
Foxxy Cleopatra, fictional character from the film Austin Powers in Goldmember
Foxxy Love, fictional character from the TV series Drawn Together